This is a list of the main career statistics of the Romanian professional tennis player Sorana Cîrstea. Cirstea has won two singles titles (2008 Tashkent Open and 2021 İstanbul Cup) and five doubles titles on the WTA Tour. She was also the runner-up at the 2013 Rogers Cup. 

 

Performance timelinesOnly main-draw results in WTA Tour, Grand Slam tournaments, Fed Cup /Billie Jean King Cup and Olympic Games are included in win–loss records.SinglesCurrent through the 2023 Dubai Open.DoublesCurrent after the 2022 French Open.Significant finals

Premier Mandatory/Premier 5 finals

Singles: 1 (1 runner-up)

WTA career finals

Singles: 6 (2 titles, 4 runner-ups)

Doubles: 10 (5 titles, 5 runner-ups)

ITF Circuit finals

Singles: 16 (9 titles, 7 runner–ups)

Doubles: 16 (9 titles, 7 runner–ups)

WTA Tour career earningsCurrent after the 2022 US Open Career Grand Slam statistics 

 Seedings 
The tournaments won by Cîrstea are in boldface, and advanced into finals by Cîrstea are in italics.

 Best Grand Slam results details 

Record against other players

 Record against top 10 players Cîrstea's record against players who have been ranked in the top 10. Active players are in boldface.''

Top 10 wins

Double Bagel matches (6–0, 6–0)

Notes

References

External links
 

Cirstea, Sorana